Euphorbia leucocephala, with many common names including little Christmas flower, white lace euphorbia, snow bush, snow flake, snows of Kilimanjaro and white Christmas bush is a species of plant in the family Euphorbiaceae. It is endemic to Mexico and Mesoamerica. Its clear sap is an irritant that can cause blisters and skin rashes. Ingesting it can cause vomiting and diarrhea.

References

External links

leucocephala
Flora of Mexico
Flora of Central America
Taxa named by Johannes Paulus Lotsy